Tugela Falls is a complex of seasonal waterfalls located in the Drakensberg (Dragon's Mountains) of Royal Natal National Park in KwaZulu-Natal Province, Republic of South Africa. According to some measurements, it is the world's tallest waterfall. A revisited validation of waterfall measurements is not available, and there's still uncertainty whether Tugela or Venezuela's Angel Falls is the tallest (both measurements were taken at considerable distance from the two waterfalls).

The combined total drop of its five distinct free-leaping falls is officially . The data were sent to the World Waterfall Database for confirmation. The source of the Tugela River (Zulu for 'sudden') is the Mont-Aux-Sources plateau which extends several kilometers beyond the Amphitheatre escarpment from which the falls drop.

Height controversy

There is an argument that Tugela Falls is the tallest waterfall in the world, rather than the more commonly cited Angel Falls. This argument is based on two likely inaccuracies regarding the presumed heights of the respective falls.

Firstly, many now believe that Angel Falls is not as tall as it was initially surveyed by American journalist Ruth Robertson in 1949.

After this the Rio Gauja flows with very little altitude loss, with nothing approaching a waterfall or even cascade before it empties into the Río Churún.

Angel Falls, however, is almost universally regarded as having the tallest single uninterrupted drop of any waterfall in the world (the total height of Tugela Falls, even though possibly the tallest on Earth, is divided into five smaller tiers, and its tallest individual tier is ).

Access
At the right time of year, the falls are easily visible from the main road into the park, especially after a heavy rain. There is an undeveloped camp site and mountain hut immediately above the falls.

There are two trails to Tugela Falls. The most spectacular trail is to the top of Mont-Aux-Sources, which starts at "The Sentinel" car park (through Phuthaditjhaba on the R57, approximately two hours drive from Royal Natal National Park via the R74, 90 minutes from Harrismith via the R712, or 80 minutes from Golden Gate Highlands National Park). From here it is a relatively easy climb to the top of the Amphitheatre that takes about 4.5 to 8 hours round-trip depending on fitness level. Access to the summit is via two chain ladders. This is the only day hiking trail which leads to the top of the Drakensberg escarpment. Another trail to the foot of Tugela Falls starts at Royal Natal National Park. The easy  gradient up the Tugela Gorge winds through indigenous forests. The last part of the hike to Tugela Falls is a boulder hop. A little chain ladder leads over the final stretch for a view of the falls rushing down the amphitheater in a series of five cascades.

See also
 List of waterfalls by height
 Tugela River
 Royal Natal National Park
 Drakensberg
 Geography of South Africa

References

External links
 Tugela Falls at World Waterfall Database
 Tourism information around Tugela Falls
 Guided viewing of the Tugela Falls

Tugela River
Waterfalls of South Africa
Landforms of KwaZulu-Natal
Tourist attractions in KwaZulu-Natal
Tiered waterfalls